Jarah-Evelyn Makalapua Mariano (born November 23, 1984) is an American model best known for her appearances in the 2008 and 2009 Sports Illustrated Swimsuit Editions, as well as Victoria's Secret.

Early life
Mariano was born in the city of Lihue on the island of Kauai in Hawaii. At the age of four Mariano relocated with her family to California, where she was raised in the city of Mission Viejo with her two older brothers.  At the age of 15 she was discovered in Santa Monica, California by a model scout, Corrie Caster. After graduating from Trabuco Hills High School, she moved to New York City, where she continued to model and attended Pace University as a full-time student, receiving her degree in Speech Communications with a Media Studies Concentration.

Career
Mariano has appeared in ads for Abercrombie & Fitch, MAC, Armani Exchange, Sephora, Roxy Quiksilver, Redken, H&M, Avon, Old Navy, Dereon, Levi's, Pac Sun and Rock and Republic, as well as numerous catalogs for Victoria's Secret.  She graced the April/May 2007 cover for Complex Magazine'''s 5th Anniversary Issue and has appeared in fashion magazines such as Self, Taiwan Vogue, L'uomo Vogue, Glamour, Elle, and Italian Vanity Fair.  She has walked in fashion shows in Miami and New York.  Mariano made her Sports Illustrated Swimsuit Edition debut in 2008 and followed up this appearance in 2009. She appeared uncredited in the title sequence of the James Bond movie Skyfall in 2012.

Mariano's television credits include Jay-Z's comeback music video "Show Me What You Got" and a cameo in the NBC television series Chuck'', several commercials for Old Navy, minor roles in Steven Spielberg's "Minority Report" and Hal Hartley's "The Girl From Monday", as well as a recurring role in "Rescue Me".  In 2009, she appeared in the music video for "Love Again" and "Kiss Kiss Kiss (키스키스키스)" by experimental fusion music Korean group Clazziquai Project.

Personal life
Mariano is of Korean and Native Hawaiian descent. She primarily resides in New York City and enjoys photography, cooking, yoga and surfing in her spare time.

References

External links

Sports Illustrated 2008 Swimsuit Model Page
 Sports Illustrated 2009 Swimsuit Model Page
Jarah Mariano at Cord Models

Living people
American female models
Pace University alumni
People from Lihue, Hawaii
People from Kauai County, Hawaii
1984 births
American people of Korean descent
American people of Native Hawaiian descent
21st-century American women